Governor Griswold may refer to:

Dwight Griswold (1893–1954), 25th Governor of Nebraska
Matthew Griswold (governor) (1714–1799), 17th Governor of Connecticut
Morley Griswold (1890–1951), 16th Governor of Nevada
Roger Griswold (1762–1812), 22nd Governor of Connecticut